Scott Robinson may refer to:

 Scott Robinson (jazz musician) (born 1959), American jazz musician
 Scott Robinson (ice hockey) (born 1964), Canadian National Hockey League player
 Scott Robinson (singer) (born 1979), English singer in boy band 5ive
 Scott Robinson (footballer) (born 1992), Scottish footballer
 Scott Robinson (Neighbours), character in the Australian soap opera Neighbours